Jessica Sophia Wright (born 14 September 1985) is an English television personality. From 2010 to 2016, she appeared in the ITVBe reality series The Only Way Is Essex.
She also appeared on the film Rise of the Footsoldier 4: Marbella (2019).

Early life
Wright is the elder daughter of Carol and Mark Wright, Sr and the sister of Mark, Josh Wright and Natalya and the cousin of Elliott Wright and Leah Wright, who also appeared in The Only Way Is Essex. She has a degree in Business & Marketing Management from Westminster University in London and her final dissertation  looked at celebrity endorsements.

Career

The Only Way Is Essex
From 2010 to 2016, Wright appeared on the ITV reality series The Only Way Is Essex. In February 2016, after five years and 16 series, Wright announced her departure from The Only Way Is Essex. Wright returned for 1 episode in series 18 to visit friend Bobby following the death of his dog.

Music
In December 2011, the cast of  The Only Way Is Essex released a cover of the Wham! song "Last Christmas", with their own version of the show's theme song "The Only Way Is Up" as the single's B-side, which was a cover of the Yazz version that is used as the theme for The Only Way Is Essex.

In 2012, Wright signed a three-single deal with All Around the World. She later went to Marbella to film the music video for her debut single "Dance All Night", which was released on 16 September 2012 and peaked at number 36 on the UK Singles Chart. Wright released her second single "Dominoes" featuring Mann on 17 February 2013, which charter on the UK Official Dance Chart at number 36. Wright then released a further track, "Come With Me", in June 2013, as part of Clubland 23.

Personal life
In May 2022, Wright gave birth to her first child, a boy.

Discography

Singles

References

1985 births
Living people
English female models
People from Brentwood, Essex
English women pop singers
21st-century English women singers
21st-century English singers